Semih Deniz (born January 5, 1989) is a Turkish Paralympics medalist middle distance runner competing in the T11, T12 and T13 class.

Semih Deniz began his sporting career in 2006. He competes for Çankaya Belediyesi SK in Ankara.

Deniz competed at the 2012 IPC Athletics European Championships held in Stadskanaal, Netherlands and won the silver medal in the 400m T12 event. The same year, he represented his country at the 2012 Paralympics in London, United Kingdom competing in the 400m T12, 800m T12, and 1500m T13 events.

In 2013, he took the bronze medal in the 1500m T12 event at the 2013 IPC Athletics World Championships in Lyon, France.

Deniz captured the silver medal in the 400m T11 event and the gold medal in the 1500m T11 event at the 2014 IPC Athletics European Championships in Swansea, Wales, United Kingdom.

In 2016, he took the gold medal in the 1500m T11 event at the 2016 IPC Athletics European Championships in Grosseto, Italy.

He won the bronze medal in the 1500m T11 event at the 2016 Paralympics in Rio de Janeiro, Brazil.

References

1989 births
Living people
Male competitors in athletics with disabilities
Visually impaired middle-distance runners
Turkish male middle-distance runners
Paralympic athletes of Turkey
Athletes (track and field) at the 2012 Summer Paralympics
Athletes (track and field) at the 2016 Summer Paralympics
Paralympic bronze medalists for Turkey
Medalists at the 2016 Summer Paralympics
Paralympic medalists in athletics (track and field)
Paralympic athletes with a vision impairment
Medalists at the World Para Athletics Championships
Medalists at the World Para Athletics European Championships
21st-century Turkish people
Turkish blind people